The 2022 Ladies Open Lausanne was a women's tennis tournament played on outdoor clay courts. It was the 29th edition of the Ladies Open Lausanne, and part of the 250 category of the 2022 WTA Tour. It took place at Tennis Club Stade-Lausanne in Lausanne, Switzerland, from 11 through 17 July 2022.

Champions

Singles 

  Petra Martić def.  Olga Danilović, 6–4, 6–2

This is Martić's second singles career title and first of the year.

Doubles 

  Olga Danilović /  Kristina Mladenovic def.  Ulrikke Eikeri /  Tamara Zidanšek, walkover

Singles main draw entrants

Seeds 

† Rankings are as of 27 June 2022

Other entrants 
The following players received wildcard entry into the singles main draw:
  Susan Bandecchi
  Kristina Mladenovic
  Simona Waltert

The following players received entry from the qualifying draw:
  Erika Andreeva
  Anna Blinkova
  Cristina Bucșa
  Olga Danilović
  Léolia Jeanjean
  Eva Lys

Withdrawals 
 Before the tournament
  Alizé Cornet → replaced by  Misaki Doi
  Camila Giorgi → replaced by  Lauren Davis
  Daria Kasatkina → replaced by  Tamara Korpatsch
  Dayana Yastremska → replaced by  Jule Niemeier
  Maryna Zanevska → replaced by  Zhu Lin
 During the tournament
  Tatjana Maria (left hip injury)

Doubles main draw entrants

Seeds 

† Rankings are as of 27 June 2022

Other entrants 
The following pairs received wildcard entry into main draw:
  Susan Bandecchi /  Simona Waltert
  Ylena In-Albon /  Xenia Knoll

Withdrawals
Before the tournament
  Monique Adamczak /  Rosalie van der Hoek → replaced by  Arianne Hartono /  Rosalie van der Hoek
During the tournament
  Anna Kalinskaya /  Raluca Olaru (Kalinskaya - right ankle injury)
  Ulrikke Eikeri /  Tamara Zidanšek (Zidanšek - COVID19 illness)

References

External links 
 Official website

Ladies Open Lausanne
WTA Swiss Open
Ladies Open Lausanne
Ladies Open Lausanne
Ladies Open Lausanne